Venelin Venkov (born April 21, 1982 in Oryahovo, Vratsa) is an amateur Bulgarian Greco-Roman wrestler, who played for the men's featherweight category. He won a silver medal for his division at the 2006 European Wrestling Championships in Moscow, Russia, losing out to Armenia's Roman Amoyan. He is also a member of Slavia Litex Wrestling Club in Sofia, and is coached and trained by Bratan Tzenov.

Venkov represented Bulgaria at the 2008 Summer Olympics in Beijing, where he competed for the men's 55 kg class. Unfortunately, he lost the qualifying round match by a fall (a score of 0–5) to Iran's Hamid Sourian.

References

External links
Profile – International Wrestling Database
NBC 2008 Olympics profile

1982 births
Living people
People from Oryahovo
Olympic wrestlers of Bulgaria
Wrestlers at the 2008 Summer Olympics
Bulgarian male sport wrestlers
20th-century Bulgarian people
21st-century Bulgarian people